Krasny Fars is a rural locality (a khutor) in Dmitriyevskoye Rural Settlement of Koshekhablsky District, Adygea, Russia. The population was 145 as of 2018. There are 5 streets.

Geography 
Krasny Fars is located 15 km west of Koshekhabl (the district's administrative centre) by road. Novoalexeyevsky is the nearest rural locality.

References 

Rural localities in Koshekhablsky District